Ta'Oi (Ta'Oih, Ta Oi) is a Katuic dialect chain of Salavan and Sekong provinces in Laos, and in Thừa Thiên-Huế province in Vietnam (Sidwell 2005:12).

Varieties
Sidwell (2005) lists the following varieties of Ta'Oi, which is a name applied to speakers of various related dialects.

Ta'Oi proper
Ong/Ir/Talan
Chatong is spoken about 50 to 100 km northeast of Sekong. It has been recorded only by Theraphan L-Thongkum.
Kriang (Ngkriang, Ngeq) is spoken by up to 4,000 people living in villages between Tatheng and Sekong, such as Ban Chakamngai.
Kataang (Katang) is a dialect that has been documented by Michel Ferlus, Gerard Diffloth, and other linguists. It is not to be confused with the Bru dialect of Katang.

Phonology

Consonants 

 There are also creaky syllable-final segments /mʔ, nʔ, ŋʔ, wʔ, lʔ, jʔ/, however; they are not noted as a distinct series.
 /ɟ/ may also be heard as a preglottal sound [ʔj].

Vowels

References

Further reading
Sidwell, Paul (2005). The Katuic languages: classification, reconstruction and comparative lexicon. LINCOM studies in Asian linguistics, 58. Muenchen: Lincom Europa. 
Trần Nguyễn Khánh Phong. 2013. Người Tà Ôi ở A Lưới. Hà Nội: Nhà xuất bản văn hóa thông tin.
 
Gehrmann, Ryan. 2017. The Historical Phonology of Kriang, A Katuic Language. JSEALS Volume 10.1 (2017).

Languages of Laos
Languages of Vietnam
Katuic languages